The Battle of Farnham was an armed conflict between the Anglo-Saxons, under the command of Alfred the Great and Edward the Elder, and the Norse Viking invaders. The raiding army of the Vikings had captured much loot from Hampshire and Berkshire before starting to return to Essex and their fleet. A Wessex army led by Edward, son of King Alfred, intercepted them at Farnham, defeated them and recaptured the plunder. The battle concluded with the vikings fleeing across the Thames towards Essex.

References 

Vikings
Farnham
Anglo-Saxon England
History of England